Adenium swazicum is a species of flowering plant in the family Apocynaceae, that is native to the lowveld of Eswatini and the Mpumalanga province of South Africa.

References

Flora of South Africa
Flora of Swaziland
swazicum
Caudiciform plants
Plants described in 1907